Milford Deal Burriss (February 23, 1937 – July 21, 2016) was an American businessman and politician in the state of South Carolina.

Biography
He served in the South Carolina House of Representatives as a member of the Republican Party from 1985 to 1990, representing Richland County, South Carolina. He was a former electrical contractor. Burris graduated from Brookland Cayce High School and then served in the United States Navy. In 1961, he graduated from the University of South Carolina, in 1961, and worked as an electrical contractor. Burriss died of acute myeloid leukemia in 2016 in Eastover where he lived.

References

1937 births
2016 deaths
People from Anderson, South Carolina
Republican Party members of the South Carolina House of Representatives
People from Eastover, South Carolina
Military personnel from South Carolina
University of South Carolina alumni
Businesspeople from South Carolina
Deaths from cancer in South Carolina
20th-century American businesspeople